Peter William Morgan (born 28 October 1951) is a Welsh former professional footballer who played as a defender. The younger brother of Richie Morgan, he began his career with Cardiff City and played alongside his brother on several occasions. He later played for Hereford United and Newport County.

References

1951 births
Living people
Welsh footballers
Footballers from Cardiff
Cardiff City F.C. players
Hereford United F.C. players
Newport County A.F.C. players
English Football League players
Association football defenders